Elachista holdgatei is a moth in the family Elachistidae. It was described by John David Bradley in 1965. It is found on the Falkland Islands.

References

Moths described in 1965
holdgatei
Moths of South America